The Count of Luxembourg is a 1926 American silent drama film directed by Arthur Gregor and starring George Walsh, Helen Lee Worthing and Michael Dark. It is based on the plot of Franz Lehar's operetta, The Count of Luxembourg.

Cast

References

Bibliography
 Goble, Alan. The Complete Index to Literary Sources in Film. Walter de Gruyter, 1999.

External links

1926 films
1926 drama films
Silent American drama films
Films directed by Arthur Gregor
American silent feature films
1920s English-language films
Films based on operettas
American black-and-white films
1920s American films